Bolewice refers to the following places in Poland:

 Bolewice, Greater Poland Voivodeship
 Bolewice, West Pomeranian Voivodeship